Ohoulo Framelin (born 21 November 1996) is a Cameroonian footballer who plays for Vitória de Sernache as a goalkeeper.

Professional career
On 30 June 2016, Framelin signed a professional contract with Nacional until 2020. Framelin made his professional debut with Nacional in a 1-0 Taça de Portugal loss to Académica on 19 November 2017.

References

External links

EFBC Profile

1993 births
Living people
Footballers from Douala
Cameroonian footballers
Association football goalkeepers
Primeira Liga players
Liga Portugal 2 players
Campeonato de Portugal (league) players
A.C. Alcanenense players
C.D. Nacional players
G.D. Vitória de Sernache players
Cameroonian expatriate footballers
Cameroonian expatriate sportspeople in Portugal
Expatriate footballers in Portugal